Dick Kallman (July 7, 1933 – February 22, 1980) was an American actor.

Early life
Kallman was born in Brooklyn in New York City, into wealth. His father, Alvan Kallman, a former barnstorming pilot, was owner of the Savoy-Plaza Hotel in New York City, The Balsams Grand Resort Hotel in New Hampshire, and the St. Johns Hotel in Havana. Kallman's mother, Zara Whitman Kallman, had been a Broadway actress.

Career
After working on the New York stage where he won a Theater World Award for his performance in the 1951 Broadway musical Seventeen, Kallman
starred in the title role of the 1965–1966 television sitcom Hank. He returned to Broadway, taking over the leading role in the musical Half a Sixpence. As a singer, he released several albums of pop standards, including Hits & the Misses and Speak Softly, and in conjunction with his TV series, Hank Sings and Dick Kallman Drops in as 'Hank'''. He performed one of his songs on an episode of Hullabaloo.

Kallman played non-recurring roles in TV series such as The Jack Benny Show, Bachelor Father and Medical Center. He also acted in episodes 110 and 111 of Batman, playing Little Louie Groovy, a takeoff on record producer Phil Spector. Groovy is a victim of a robbery at his apartment by the team of Catwoman and The Joker.

Filmography
{| class="wikitable sortable"
|+ Television and Film
! Year
! Title
! Role
! class="unsortable" style="width:20em;" | Notes
|-
|rowspan="2"|1950
|The Billy Rose Show 
|Unnamed role
|(TV Series), 1 episode: "Bright Golden Girl"
|-
|Skylarkin' Time 
|Singer
|(Short film)
|-
|1955-1960
|The Jack Benny Program|Dancer in Diner (1955)/ Unnamed role (1960)
|(TV Series), 2 episodes: "Jack's Lunch Counter" and "Lunch Counter Murder"
|-
|1957
|Hell Canyon Outlaws|Smiley Andrews
|(Western film)
|-
|1958-1960
|U.S. Marshal|Young Deputy (1958)/ Harry (1960)
|(TV Series), 2 episodes: "Seventh Stranger" and "Paper Bullets"
|-
|rowspan="7"|1959
|The Texan
|Ben Howell / Grady Fenton
|(TV Series), 2 episodes: "The Gunfighter" and "Dangerous Ground"
|-
|Markham
|Martin Valcour
|(TV Series), 1 episode: "The Nephews"
|-
|Born to Be Loved
|Eddie Flynn
|(Comedy Film)
|-
|Bachelor Father
|Mike Brinkerhoff
|(TV Series), 1 episode: "Bentley and the Motorcycle"
|-
|Whirlybirds 
|Johnny
|(TV Series), 1 episode: "A Matter of Trust"
|-
|The Californians
|Armand
|(TV Series), 1 episode: "Deadly Tintype"
|-
|Verboten!
|Helmuth Strasser
|(War film)
|-
|1960
|The Lucy-Desi Comedy Hour 
|Bellboy
|(TV Series), 1 episode: "Lucy Meets the Mustache"
|-
|1961
|Back Street
|Sailor at USO
|(Drama Film)
|-
|1965-1966
|Hank
|Hank Dearborn (title role)
|(TV Series), 26 episodes
|-
|1967
|Doctor, You've Got to Be Kidding!
|Pat Murad
|(Comedy Film)
|-
|1967-1968
|Batman
|Little Louie Groovy
|(TV Series), 2 episodes: "The Funny Feline Felonies" and "The Joke's on Catwoman"
|-
|1970-1974
|Medical Center
|Dr. Charlie Guinness (1970)/ Dr. Styles (1972)/ Larry (1974)
|(TV Series), 3 episodes: "Witch Hunt", "The Outcast" and "Adults Only" 
|-
|}

Personal life
Kallman had from youth exhibited an appreciation of fine antique furnishings and an acumen for business. Kallman formed a music publishing company in 1966. By the late 1970s, he had retired from show business and was a wealthy antiques and art dealer and living with Stephen Szladek, his life partner, in a Manhattan apartment.

Kallman and Szladek were murdered by three intruders in 1980 during a robbery of the art, antiques and jewelry in their apartment. The killers were later caught and convicted. A fictionalized account of Kallman’s life, Up With the Sun by Thomas Mallon, was published by Knopf in Feb., 2023.

References

External links

Dick Kallman at TV Guide
Dick Kallman at Fandango

Dick Kallman at Allmusic

Hank at TV Party
Hank at Sitcoms Online
 (Flash video)

1933 births
1980 deaths
1980 murders in the United States
20th-century American male actors
American male television actors
Burials at Forest Lawn Memorial Park (Hollywood Hills)
Deaths by firearm in Manhattan
Deaths from bleeding
American gay actors
Male actors from New York City
Male murder victims
People murdered in New York City
People from Brooklyn
People from Manhattan
20th-century LGBT people